Anti-IgLON5 disease is a neurodegenerative autoimmune disease. It is marked by parasomnias and chorea - an involuntary movement disorder.



Pathophysiology 
The IgLON proteins are a family of five cell-adhesion molecules IgLON 1, 2, 3, 4 & 5, which assist in neuronal growth and connections among nerve cells. and help in brain evolution and maturation to maintain integrity of the blood brain barrier.

Abnormal pTau deposits seen in several brains, brain stems and upper cervical cords shown by neuro-immuno-histochemistry studies of brain tissue from these regions without inflammatory cells differentiate this entity from other autoimmune encephalitis.

IgLON5 refers to a cell surface protein involved in promoting connections among nerve cells. Prevalence of the HLA-DRB1*10:01 allele was greatly increased in people with anti-IgLON5 disease. The sleep problems seen in this disorder are insomnia, sleep related abnormal movements called parasomnias which may be seen in both REM  and NREM sleep and poor efficiency of sleep. Respiratory problems related to sleep disorder such as obstructive sleep apnea (OSA) and jerky stertorous breathing were noted in more than half the cases.

Diagnosis

Serum studies show IgLON5 antibodies in almost all patients while the presence of CSF antibodies is more sporadic, occurring in ~50% of cases. Additional findings may be Oligoclonal bands(OCB), a few leukocytes and a slight rise in proteins, with otherwise normal CSF examination in more than half the cases.

If tau, p-tau or beta-amyloid are found then they indicate the neuropathology of the disorder, thereby distinguishing it from other autoimmune encephalitis.

Brain Imaging 
MRI scans of the brain show brain stem atrophy in half the cases and changes in  brain regions having tau-pathy in one fifths, FDG Positron emission scans-(FDG - PET)show hyper-metabolism in region of tau-pathy in half the cases correlating well with the clinical features.

Treatment 
Anti-IgLON5 disease is mainly treated with immunosuppressants (80%), mostly cycles of IV corticosteroids (58%) in combination with IV immunoglobulins (IVIg−36%) and/or TPE (27%). Alternative successfully used, second-line treatments are Rituximab (22%) and Cyclophosphamide (12%), Azathioprine and Mycophenolat Mofetil.

Sudden death is the most common outcome in nearly 34% of patients, irrespective of partial response to therapy. While complications from aspiration were the other common cause of death.

Symptomatic treatment with CPAP in patients with OSA helps improve respiratory symptoms, while parasomnias and movement disorders (myoclonus, parkinsonism, and dystonia) did not respond when antiepileptic, dopaminergic, and anti-hyperkinetic drugs were administered.

References 

Autoimmune diseases
Encephalitis